The 1993 European Tour, titled as the 1993 Volvo Tour for sponsorship reasons, was the 22nd official season of golf tournaments known as the PGA European Tour.

The season was made up of 38 tournaments counting for the Order of Merit, and five non-counting "Approved Special Events".

The Order of Merit was won by Scotland's Colin Montgomerie for the first time, overtaking Nick Faldo with victory in the season ending Volvo Masters.

Changes for 1993
There were few changes from the previous season, with the addition of the Madeira Island Open and a ProServ tournament in Bologna replacing the Volvo Open di Firenze. A new tournament was planned for South Africa but was not finalised.

The cancellation of the Monte Carlo Open in February prompted rescheduling of the Irish Open to ensure there was no gap in the schedule prior to The Open Championship. The Honda Open, originally scheduled opposite the Dunhill Cup, was later moved to the fill the dates vacated by the Irish Open. In early March, the Kronenbourg Open was added to replace the cancelled ProServ tournament.

Schedule
The following table lists official events during the 1993 season.

Unofficial events
The following events were sanctioned by the European Tour, but did not carry official money, nor were wins official.

Order of Merit
The Order of Merit was titled as the Volvo Order of Merit and was based on prize money won during the season, calculated in Pound sterling.

Awards

See also
List of golfers with most European Tour wins

Notes

References

External links
1993 season results on the PGA European Tour website
1993 Order of Merit on the PGA European Tour website

European Tour seasons
European Tour